The Directorate of Integration and Diversity is a Norwegian government agency which is responsible for implementing public policy concerning refugees and integration. It is subordinate to the Ministry of Justice and Public Security and was established in 2006. The directorate is headquartered in Oslo, and has offices in Bergen, Gjøvik, Kristiansand, Narvik, and Trondheim.

Directors-General
Osmund Kaldheim (2005–2010)
Geir Barvik (2010–2016)
Libe Rieber-Mohn (2016–present)

References

External links
 Official website

Government agencies of Norway
2006 establishments in Norway
Government agencies established in 2006
Immigration to Norway